Carriacou and Petite Martinique, a dependency of Grenada, returns one member to the country's Parliament.

1924-1935

Members since 1935

Elections

Elections in the 2000s

Notes

References

People from Carriacou and Petite Martinique
Constituencies of Grenada
Lists of office-holders
Grenada politics-related lists